Macrosaldula is a genus of shore bugs in the family Saldidae. There are more than 20 described species in Macrosaldula.

Species
These 24 species belong to the genus Macrosaldula:

 Macrosaldula bogdashana Luo & Vinokurov, 2011
 Macrosaldula clavalis Cobben, 1985
 Macrosaldula heijningeni (Cobben, 1959)
 Macrosaldula indica Vinokurov, 2013
 Macrosaldula inornata Cobben, 1985
 Macrosaldula jakowleffi (Reuter, 1891)
 Macrosaldula kaszabi (Hoberlandt, 1971)
 Macrosaldula kerzhneri Cobben, 1985
 Macrosaldula koktshetavica Cobben, 1985
 Macrosaldula koreana (Kiritshenko, 1912)
 Macrosaldula madonica (Seidenstucker, 1961)
 Macrosaldula miyamotoi Cobben, 1985
 Macrosaldula monae (Drake, 1952)
 Macrosaldula mongolica (Kiritshenko, 1912)
 Macrosaldula nivalis (Lindberg, 1935)
 Macrosaldula oblonga (Stål, 1858)
 Macrosaldula rivularia (Sahlberg, 1878)
 Macrosaldula roborowskii (Jakovlev, 1889)
 Macrosaldula scotica (Curtis, 1833)
 Macrosaldula shikokuana Cobben, 1985
 Macrosaldula simulans Cobben, 1985
 Macrosaldula tadzhika (Kiritshenko, 1912)
 Macrosaldula variabilis (Herrich-Schaeffer, 1835)
 Macrosaldula violacea Cobben, 1985

References

Further reading

External links

 

Articles created by Qbugbot
Heteroptera genera
Saldoidini